Sarah Ann Kennedy is a British voice actress best known for providing the voices of Miss Rabbit and Mummy Rabbit in the children's animated series Peppa Pig, Nanny Plum in the children's animated series Ben & Holly's Little Kingdom and Dolly Pond in Pond Life. She is also a writer and animation director and the creator of Crapston Villas, an animated soap opera for Channel 4. She has also written for HIT Entertainment and Peppa Pig, and is currently a lecturer at the University of Central Lancashire.

References

External links
Sarah Ann Kennedy CV

British animators
British animated film directors
British women film directors
British voice actresses
Living people
British women animators
Place of birth missing (living people)
Year of birth missing (living people)